Hubertina Petronella Maria "Bettine" Vriesekoop (born 13 August 1961) is a former table tennis player from the Netherlands. She was European champion in 1982 and 1992 individually and in 1982 in mixed doubles. She competed at the 1988, 1992 and 1996 Olympics in singles and women doubles with the best achievement of sevenths place in both events in 1988.

Vriesekoop started playing table tennis in 1972, and between 1977 and 2002 played at top level in Europe. She won the European Championship twice and was a Dutch Champion fourteen times in the singles and sixteen times in the doubles. Until 1989 she worked with coach Gerard Bakker, and then worked with Jan Vlieg.

Biography
Vriesekoop was the youngest of nine siblings in a farmers family. Her father died of cancer when she was nine years old. In 1995 she appeared on the cover of Playboy Europe, and the issue contained an unprecedented 12-page interview with her. The money she received from Playboy helped her solve financial problems. She retired from competition in 1997, and in 1999 gave birth to a son, but her husband died shortly before that. While training in China she became interested in the culture and then studied Chinese language and philosophy in Leiden. Between 2006 and 2009 she worked in Beijing as a freelance correspondent for several Dutch newspapers including NRC Handelsblad. She was selected as the "Dutch Table Tennis Player of the Century" in 2000 and as the Dutch Sportsman of the year in 1981 and 1985.

Career highlights

Summer Olympic Games
1988, Seoul, women's singles, 7th
1988, Seoul, women's doubles, 7th
1992, Barcelona, women's singles, last 16
1992, Barcelona, women's doubles, quarter final
1996, Atlanta, women's singles, 1st round
1996, Atlanta, women's doubles, 1st round
World Championships
1979, Pyongyang, women's singles, last 16
1979, Pyongyang, women's doubles, last 16
1979, Pyongyang, mixed doubles, last 16
1981, Novi Sad, women's singles, last 16
1983, Tokyo, women's singles, last 16
1983, Tokyo, women's doubles, last 16
1983, Tokyo, mixed doubles, quarter final
1983, Tokyo, team competition, 8th
1985, Gothenburg, women's singles, last 16
1985, Gothenburg, women's doubles, last 16
1985, Gothenburg, team competition, 4th
1987, New Delhi, team competition, 4th
1995, Tianjin, women's doubles, last 16
World Doubles Cup:
1992, Las Vegas, women's singles, quarter final
World Team Cup:
1994, Nîmes, 3rd 
Pro Tour Grand Finals
1996, Tianjin, women's singles, last 16
Pro Tour Meetings
1996, Kettering, women's singles, quarter final
1996, Kitaku-Shu, women's singles, quarter final
1996, Kitaku-Shu, women's doubles, quarter final
1998, Beirut, women's doubles, quarter final
European Championships
1980, Bern, women's singles, semi final
1982, Budapest, women's singles, winner 
1982, Budapest, women's doubles, runner-up 
1982, Budapest, mixed doubles, winner 
1984, Moscow, women's singles, quarter final
1984, Moscow, women's doubles, semi final
1984, Moscow, mixed doubles, semi final
1986, Prague, women's singles, quarter final
1986, Prague, women's doubles, runner-up 
1988, Paris, mixed doubles, runner-up 
1990, Gothenburg, women's doubles, quarter final
1992, Stuttgart, women's singles, winner 
1992, Stuttgart, women's doubles, semi final
1992, Stuttgart, team competition, 2nd 
1996, Bratislava, women's doubles, runner-up 
1998, Eindhoven, women's singles, quarter final
European Youth Championships
1977, Vichy, women's singles, winner  (juniors)
1978, Barcelona, women's singles, semi final (juniors)
1979, Rome, women's singles, winner  (juniors)
European Top-12 Championships
1978, Prague, 2nd 
1979, Kristianstad, 8th
1980, Munich, 2nd 
1981, Miskolc, 2nd 
1982, Nantes, 1st 
1983, Cleveland, 3rd, 
1984, Bratislava, 2nd 
1985, Barcelona, 1st 
1986, Södertälje, 5th
1987, Basel, 4th
1988, Ljubljana, 2nd 
1991, Den Bosch, 3rd 
1992, Vienna, 9th
1993, Copenhagen, 5th
1994, Arezzo, 7th
1995, Dijon, 5th
1996, Charleroi, 3rd 
1997, Eindhoven, 5th
1999, Split, 11th

Books

Bettine Vriesekoop (2021). Het China gevoel van Pearl S. Buck, Brandt, Uitgeverij, ISBN 978 94 93095 44 1

References

External links

 (in Dutch)
 ITTF Profile

1961 births
Living people
Dutch female table tennis players
Olympic table tennis players of the Netherlands
People from Hazerswoude
Table tennis players at the 1988 Summer Olympics
Table tennis players at the 1992 Summer Olympics
Table tennis players at the 1996 Summer Olympics
Sportspeople from South Holland